The 1st Golden Horse Awards took place on 31 October 1962 at Kuo Kuang Cinema in Taipei, Taiwan.

Winners and nominees 
Winners are listed first, highlighted in boldface.

References

1st
1962 film awards
1962 in Taiwan